Homidiana canace is a moth of the  family Sematuridae. It is known from the Neotropics, including Brazil and Colombia.

References

Sematuridae
Sematuridae of South America
Moths described in 1856
Moths of South America